Uttar Pradesh Congress Committee (UPCC) is the Pradesh Congress Committee (state wing) of the Indian National Congress (INC) serving in the state of Uttar Pradesh.

Congress Working Committee Appointed Priyanka Gandhi as General Secretary of UP (East), later she has taken charge of General Secretary (AICC). CLP Leader of the Uttar Pradesh Congress Committee is Aradhana Misra 3rd Term MLA from Rampur Khas, Pratapgarh.

Structure and Composition

Advisory Council to General Secretary

Group on Strategy and Planning

MPs and MLAs from Uttar Pradesh

Election Results

Uttar Pradesh Legislative Assembly

Indian General Election in Uttar Pradesh

List of chief ministers

See also
 Indian National Congress
 Congress Working Committee
 All India Congress Committee
 Pradesh Congress Committee
 Madhya Pradesh Youth Congress

References

External links
 Indian National Congress, Official website

Indian National Congress of Uttar Pradesh